Ephippianthus is a genus of flowering plants from the orchid family, Orchidaceae. It contains two known species, native to northeastern Asia.

See also 
 List of Orchidaceae genera

References 

  (1868)  Flora 51: 33.
  2005. Handbuch der Orchideen-Namen. Dictionary of Orchid Names. Dizionario dei nomi delle orchidee. Ulmer, Stuttgart
  (2006). Epidendroideae (Part One). Genera Orchidacearum 4: 101 ff. Oxford University Press.

External links 

Calypsoinae
Calypsoinae genera